Valerio González Schcolnik (born 11 April 1967) is a Mexican politician from the National Action Party. In 2012 he served as Deputy of the LXI Legislature of the Mexican Congress representing Sinaloa.

References

1967 births
Living people
Politicians from Sinaloa
People from Sinaloa
National Action Party (Mexico) politicians
21st-century Mexican politicians
Deputies of the LXI Legislature of Mexico
Members of the Chamber of Deputies (Mexico) for Sinaloa